Vidhyaa Vikas Educational Institutions is a group of educational institutions located in Tiruchengode in the Indian state of Tamil Nadu.

References

Schools in Tamil Nadu
Education in Namakkal district